Roosevelt was a French sailor who competed in the 1900 Summer Olympics in Meulan, France. Roosevelt as helmsman, did not start in first race of the 0.5 to 1 ton and did not finish in the second race. He did this with the boat Verveine.

Further reading

References

External links

French male sailors (sport)
Sailors at the 1900 Summer Olympics – .5 to 1 ton
Olympic sailors of France
Sailors at the 1900 Summer Olympics – Open class
Year of birth missing